Isamilo International School Mwanza, founded in 1956, is an international school for students aged 3 to 18 in Mwanza, Tanzania. The school has been known as The Government European School, Isamilo Primary School and Isamilo School Mwanza before being renamed in 2008 to its present name, Isamilo International School Mwanza.

The school teaches subjects in accordance with the British National Curriculum. The school has  added A-Levels and boarding to the school as an addition to the IGCSEs that it has offered since 1998 when it opened the secondary school.  Exams are provided by the Cambridge International Examinations (CIE) board.

The original school motto was "quisque ingenium perficiat" and the new school slogan, adopted in 2008, is "The Right Balance". The school is registered with the Tanzanian Ministry of Education and Culture (Nos: MZ.01/4/002 & S.957), the British Department for Children, Schools and Families (DfCSf No. 703 6228), and the Association of International Schools in Africa (AISA).

External links 

 http://www.isamiloschool.org/ Isamilo International School Mwanza
 http://www.cie.org.uk/ University of Cambridge International Examinations
 http://www.dcsf.gov.uk/ Department for Children, Schools and Families

International schools in Tanzania
Boarding schools in Tanzania
Private schools in Tanzania
Cambridge schools in Tanzania
Primary schools in Tanzania
Secondary schools in Tanzania
Mwanza
Educational institutions established in 1956
1956 establishments in Tanganyika
Buildings and structures in the Mwanza Region